Nadel, which means needle in German, is a surname that may refer to:

 Adam Nadel, New York City-based photographer
 Arthur Nadel (born 1932), hedge fund manager accused of $350 million fraud
 Barbara Nadel, an English crime-writer and previous winner of the CWA Silver Dagger
 Eric Nadel (born 1951), sports announcer on radio broadcasts for the Texas Rangers baseball organization
 Gedaliah Nadel (1923–2004), one of the heads of Kollel Chazon Ish and the leading decider of Jewish Law in the Chazon Ish neighborhood of Bene Barak
 Ira Nadel (born 1943), American-Canadian biographer, literary critic and James Joyce scholar
 Jack Nadel, author, entrepreneur and proponent of ethics in business
 Jennifer Nadel, British barrister, journalist and activist.
 Lynn Nadel (born 1942), Regents' Professor of Psychology at the University of Arizona
 Nancy Nadel, U.S. politician
 Nicole Nadel (born 2000), Israeli tennis player 
 Siegfried Frederick Nadel (1903–1956), an Austrian-born British anthropologist, specialising in African ethnology
 Larry Nadle, comic book editor sometimes credited as "Larry Nadel"

See also
 Nadal (disambiguation)
 Needle

Surnames
Jewish surnames
Surnames of German origin
Yiddish-language surnames